Sue Ellen Bernal Bolnik (born 25 September 1982) is a Mexican politician affiliated with the PRI. She currently serves as Deputy of the LXII Legislature of the Mexican Congress representing the Mexico state.

References

1982 births
Living people
Women members of the Chamber of Deputies (Mexico)
Members of the Chamber of Deputies (Mexico)
Institutional Revolutionary Party politicians
21st-century Mexican politicians
21st-century Mexican women politicians
Monterrey Institute of Technology and Higher Education alumni
Deputies of the LXII Legislature of Mexico